Rachel Mary Ann Cecilia Burden (born 22 January 1975 in Marlow, Buckinghamshire, England) is a newsreader, radio news reporter and presenter. She has presented the BBC Radio 5 Live weekday breakfast show since 2011. She is also one of the main weekend presenters of BBC Breakfast.

Early life
The fourth of five children, Burden is the only daughter of former BBC journalist Paul Burden and his wife, and the niece of the actor Hugh Burden. She went to school from 1987-93 at Wycombe High School, a girls' grammar school in High Wycombe, taking English, History, Politics and Practical Music at A-level. After graduating from Trinity College, Dublin, she studied broadcast journalism at Cardiff University.

Career
Burden began her career as a reporter at BBC Radio Suffolk, and 15 months later joined BBC Radio Bristol where she co-hosted the early morning breakfast show, working alongside Nigel Dando, the brother of the murdered presenter Jill Dando. She joined Radio 5 Live in 2003, the day before her father retired from the BBC. She took over the weekday breakfast show from Shelagh Fogarty in May 2011, alongside co-presenter Nicky Campbell. Burden made her debut on the BBC Breakfast television programme as a relief presenter on Saturday 23 August 2015.

Personal life
Burden is married to journalist Luke Mendham and has four children. The family live in Knutsford, Cheshire.

References

External links
 
 5 Live Breakfast (BBC Radio 5 Live)

1975 births
Living people
Alumni of Cardiff University
Alumni of Trinity College Dublin
BBC Radio 5 Live presenters
British radio personalities
Irish expatriates in the United Kingdom
People educated at Wycombe High School
People from Marlow, Buckinghamshire